Manoury is a French family name:

Many people including these famous persons hold this name: 

Philippe Manoury (1952), French composer
Michel-Joseph Maunoury (1847-1923), French marshall 
Simon Maunoury, French badminton player

See also
Manoury Island
Famille Manoury

References

French-language surnames